Adoxophyes is a genus of moths of the tribe Archipini.

Species

Adoxophyes acrocindina Diakonoff, 1983
Adoxophyes afonini Razowski, 2009
Adoxophyes aniara Diakonoff, 1941
Adoxophyes aurantia Clarke, 1976
Adoxophyes aurantiana Bradley, 1961
Adoxophyes aurata Diakonoff, 1968
Adoxophyes balioleuca Clarke, 1976
Adoxophyes beijingensis Zhou, Qui & Fu, 1997
Adoxophyes bematica Meyrick, 1910
Adoxophyes chloromydra Meyrick, 1926
Adoxophyes congruana (Walker, 1863)
Adoxophyes controversa Diakonoff, 1952
Adoxophyes croesus Diakonoff, 1975
Adoxophyes cyrtosema Meyrick, 1886
Adoxophyes dubia Yasuda, 1998
Adoxophyes ergatica Meyrick, 1911
Adoxophyes fasciata Walsingham, 1900
Adoxophyes fasciculana (Walker, 1866)
Adoxophyes flagrans Meyrick, 1912
Adoxophyes furcatana (Walker, 1863)
Adoxophyes heteroidana Meyrick, 1881
Adoxophyes honmai Yasuda, 1998
Adoxophyes horographa Meyrick, 1928
Adoxophyes instillata Meyrick, 1922
Adoxophyes lacertana Razowski, 2013
Adoxophyes liberatrix (Diakonoff, 1947)
Adoxophyes libralis Meyrick, 1927
Adoxophyes luctuosa Razowski, 2013
Adoxophyes marmarygodes Diakonoff, 1952
Adoxophyes meion Razowski, 2013
Adoxophyes melia Clarke, 1976
Adoxophyes melichroa (Lower, 1899)
Adoxophyes microptycha Diakonoff, 1957
Adoxophyes moderatana (Walker, 1863)
Adoxophyes molybdaina Clarke, 1976
Adoxophyes nebrodes Meyrick, 1920
Adoxophyes negundana (McDunnough, 1923) – shimmering adoxophyes moth
Adoxophyes nemorum Diakonoff, 1941
Adoxophyes olethra Razowski, 2013
Adoxophyes orana (Fischer von Rslerstamm, 1834) – summer fruit tortrix moth
Adoxophyes panurga Razowski, 2013
Adoxophyes panxantha (Lower, 1901)
Adoxophyes parameca Razowski, 2013
Adoxophyes parastropha Meyrick, 1912
Adoxophyes perangusta Diakonoff, 196
Adoxophyes peritoma Meyrick, 1918
Adoxophyes perstricta Meyrick, 1928
Adoxophyes planes Razowski, 2013
Adoxophyes poecilogramma Clarke, 1976
Adoxophyes privatana (Walker, 1863)
Adoxophyes prosiliens Meyrick, 1928
Adoxophyes psammocyma (Meyrick, 1908)
Adoxophyes revoluta (Meyrick, 1908)
Adoxophyes rhopalodesma Diakonoff, 1961
Adoxophyes telesticta Meyrick, 1930
Adoxophyes templana (Pagenstecher, 1900)
Adoxophyes tetraphracta Meyrick, 1938
Adoxophyes thoracica Diakonoff, 1941
Adoxophyes tripselia (Lower, 1908)
Adoxophyes trirhabda Diakonoff, 1969
Adoxophyes vindicata Meyrick, 1910

See also
List of Tortricidae genera

References

 , 2005: World Catalogue of Insects volume 5 Tortricidae.
 , 1881, Proc. Linn. Soc. N.S. W. 6: 429.
 , 2009, Tortricidae from Vietnam in the collection of the Berlin Museum.5. Archipini and Sparganothini (Lepidoptera: Tortricidae), Shilap revista de Lepidopterologia 37 (145): 41-60.
 , 1998: The Japanese species of the genus Adoxophyes Meyrick (Lepidoptera, Tortricidae). Transactions of the Lepidopterological Society of Japan 49(3): 159-173. Abstract and full article: .

External links
tortricidae.com

 
Archipini
Taxa named by Edward Meyrick
Tortricidae genera